"Hanna Hanna" is a song by China Crisis. It was released as the fourth single from their 1983 album Working with Fire and Steel – Possible Pop Songs Volume Two and reached number 44 on the UK Singles Chart.

Track listing
UK 7" single
"Hanna Hanna" – 3.25
"African and White" (Live) – 3.48

UK 12" single
"Hanna Hanna" (Extended Mix) – 5.17
"Here Come a Raincloud" (Live) – 6.00
"African and White" (Live) – 3.48

References

1984 singles
1983 songs
China Crisis songs
Virgin Records singles
Song recordings produced by Mike Howlett